Herschel Rosenthal (March 13, 1918 – June 19, 2009) was an American politician who was a member of the California State Assembly from 1974 to 1982 and the California State Senate from 1982 to 1998. Rosenthal was a Democrat.

Death
Rosenthal died on June 19, 2009, at the age of 91.

References

1918 births
2009 deaths
Politicians from St. Louis
Musicians from Sacramento, California
California state senators
Members of the California State Assembly
Jewish American state legislators in California
20th-century American musicians
20th-century American politicians
20th-century American Jews
21st-century American Jews